Vismaya is an amusement water theme park near Taliparamba in Kannur, Kerala. The park is developed and run by Malabar Tourism Development Co-operative Limited (MTDC). It is situated near to the famous Muthappan temple in Parassinikadavu. It was officially inaugurated in August 2008 and since then it has become one of the favorite holiday destination in Malabar.

Developments and the future
Malabar Tourism Development Cooperative Limited (MTDC) was registered on 15 February 2000. And one month later on 9 March 2000 kick-started its operations with E.P. Jayarajan as the chairman. The job sector of Malabar, mainly Kannur focused on textile industry especially handloom, khadi and other industries such as beedi, pottery etc. an integral part of conventional occupation of the region. But all these occupations faced many challenges which gradually lead to an economic decline. In such scenario, to meet the growing market and to create more job opportunities in addition to catering to the growing tourism industry, MTDC came into existence.

The main objects of MTDC are to promote, establish, maintain and manage the business related to tourism and hospitality industry by setting up establishment such as:
 Amusement park, museum.
 Tour operations for foreign and domestic tourists.
 Hotels, restaurants, cool bars, ice cream stall, motels etc.
 Shops for selling handicrafts, curious etc.
 Water sports and river cruises.
 Hill and beach resorts with all modern facilities to attract foreign and domestic tourists, etc.

Vismaya park is one of the first projects started by MTDC.

Features

Vismaya is a blend of amusement, water theme and infotainment park. It has got water rides, informative and entertaining activities for kids and adventurous rides for adults.

Main attractions
Virtual waterfall and Laser show are the two main attractions of this amusement park. Virtual waterfall is a musical waterfall where the visitors dance under the water stream to the background music. This crowd puller is open everyday starting 2 pm and usually ends by 3 pm. Laser shows are usually staged in the evening, and are a major attraction.

Rides
Major rides are:
 Aqua Trail
 Electric swing
 Giant wheel
 Jumping frog
 Merry go round
 Sky Train
 Striking car
 Tide pool
 Tornado
 Twister

Rain water harvesting
The rain water harvesting plan undertook by Vismaya is spread over two acres of reservoir and all the water requirements of the park is met with this collected water. This green policy undertaken by Vismaya makes it one of the environmental friendly water theme parks in the world.

Nearby attractions
 Aralam Wildlife Sanctuary
 Bekal Fort
 Dharmadam island
 Ezhimala
 Meenkunnu Beach
 Muthappan temple
 Muzhappilangad beach
 Paithalmala
 Parassinikkadavu Snake Park
 Payyambalam Beach

Other attractions
 Theyyam
 Kolkali
 Poorakkali
 Thidambu Nritham

Cuisine
 Kalathappam
 Kinnathappam
 Pathiri

See also
 North Malabar
 Kerala Tourism

Image gallery

References

Sources
 Keralatourism.org
 Asianetindia.com
 Livekerala.blogspot.com
 My-kerala.com
 Zonkerala.com

External links

 Vismayakerala.com

Amusement parks in Kerala
Water parks in India
2008 establishments in Kerala
Tourism in Kerala
Tourist attractions in Kannur district
Dharmashala, Kannur